Ebin Delmer Lundgren (September 21, 1899 – October 19, 1984) was a pitcher in Major League Baseball who played from  through  for the Pittsburgh Pirates (1924) and Boston Red Sox (1926–27). He was born in Lindsborg, Kansas.

In a three-season career, Lundgren posted a 5–15 record 54 strikeouts and a 6.51 ERA in 56 appearances, including 19 starts, five complete games, two shutouts, and 184.0 innings of work.

Lundgren died in his hometown of Lindsborg at age 84.

External links

1899 births
1984 deaths
Pittsburgh Pirates players
Boston Red Sox players
People from Lindsborg, Kansas
Major League Baseball pitchers
Baseball players from Kansas
Salina Millers players
Birmingham Barons players
Minneapolis Millers (baseball) players
Nashville Vols players
Minor league baseball managers